The 1999 Yonex All England Open was the 89th edition of the All England Open Badminton Championships. It was held from 9 to 14 March 1999, in Birmingham, England.

It was a four-star tournament and the prize money was US$125,000.

Venue
National Indoor Arena

Final results

Men's singles

Section 1

Section 2

Women's singles

Section 1

Section 2

References

External links
Smash: 1999 All England Open

All England Open Badminton Championships
All England Open
All England
Sports competitions in Birmingham, West Midlands
All England Open Badminton Championships